The 18th Lo Nuestro Awards was held on February 23, 2006 at the American Airlines Arena in Miami.
The nominees were announced on December 12, 2005, during a press conference televised live on the Univision Network morning show ¡Despierta América!. The show was co-hosted by René Strickler and Patricia Manterola.

Nominees and winners
This is the full list of nominees and winners of the 18th Lo Nuestro Award.

Lifetime Achievement Award
 Ana Gabriel

Pop

Album of the Year
 Fijación Oral Vol. 1 – Shakira
 Escucha – Laura Pausini
 Fuego – Kumbia Kings
 Paso a Paso – Luis Fonsi
 Todo el Año – Obie Bermúdez

Male Artist
 Luis Fonsi
 Alejandro Fernández
 Obie Bermúdez
 Reyli

Female Artist
 Laura Pausini
 Jimena
 Julieta Venegas
 Paulina Rubio

Group or Duo
 Shakira & Alejandro Sanz
 Aleks Syntek y Ana Torroja
 Kumbia Kings
 La 5ª Estación

Song of the Year
 "La Tortura" – Shakira y Alejandro Sanz
 "La Camisa Negra" – Juanes
 "Nada Es Para Siempre" – Luis Fonsi
 "Víveme" – Laura Pausini
 "Volverte a ver" – Juanes

Best New Soloist or Group of the Year
 RBD
 Lena
 Lu
 Reik

Rock

Album of the Year
 Con Todo Respeto – Molotov Andrea Echeverri – Andrea Echeverri
 Consejo – La Secta AllStar
 Consuelo en Domingo – Enjambre
 En el Cielo de Tu Boca – Circo

Artist of the Year
 Juanes Circo
 Enjambre
 La Secta AllStar

Song of the Year
 "Nada Valgo Sin Tu Amor" – Juanes "A Eme O" – Andrea Echeverri
 "Amateur" – Molotov
 "Biografía" – Enjambre
 "Un Accidente" – Circo

Tropical
Album of the Year
 Una Nueva Mujer – Olga Tañón Amanecer Contigo – Frankie Negrón
 Aquí Estamos y De Verdad – El Gran Combo
 Hasta el Fin – Monchy y Alexandra
 Ironía – Andy Andy

Male Artist
 Marc Anthony Carlos Vives
 Gilberto Santa Rosa
 Juan Luis Guerra

Female Artist
 Olga Tañón Brenda K. Starr
 Melina León
 Milly Quezada

Group or Duo
 Aventura El Gran Combo
 Monchy y Alexandra
 N'Klabe

Song of the Year
 "Bandolero" – Olga Tañón "Se Esfuma Tu Amor" – Marc Anthony
 "Hasta el Fin" – Monchy y Alexandra
 "Perdidos" – Monchy y Alexandra
 "Que Ironía" – Andy Andy

Merengue Artist
 Olga Tañón La Gran Banda
 Los Toros Band
 Juan Luis Guerra

Salsa Artist
 Marc Anthony El Gran Combo
 Gilberto Santa Rosa
 Tito Nieves

Traditional Artist
 Aventura Andy Andy
 Carlos Vives
 Monchy y Alexandra

New Soloist or Group of the Year 
 Xtreme Ciclón
 Edgar Daniel
 T4

Mexican Music
Album of the Year
 Diez – Intocable Directo al Corazón – Los Tigres del Norte
 Hoy Como Ayer – Conjunto Primavera
 Pensando en Ti – K-Paz de la Sierra
 Razón de Sobra – Marco Antonio Solís

Male Artist
 Marco Antonio Solís Luis Miguel
 Pepe Aguilar
 Sergio Vega

Female Artist
 Ana Bárbara Diana Reyes
 Isabela
 Mariana

Group or Duo
 Intocable Beto y sus Canarios
 Conjunto Primavera
 K-Paz de la Sierra

Song of the Year
 "Aire" – Intocable "Eres Divina" – Patrulla 81
 "Está Llorando Mi Corazón" – Beto y sus Canarios
 "Hoy Como Ayer" – Conjunto Primavera
 "Volveré" – K-Paz de la Sierra

Band of the Year
 Banda el Recodo Beto y sus Canarios
 K-Paz de la Sierra
 Patrulla 81

Grupera Artist
 Los Temerarios Marco Antonio Solís
 Bronco - El Gigante de América
 Grupo Innovación

Norteño Artist
 Intocable Conjunto Primavera
 Huracanes del Norte
 Los Tigres del Norte

Ranchera Artist
 Vicente Fernández Luis Miguel
 Ezequiel Peña
 Pepe Aguilar

New Soloist or Group of the Year
 La Autoridad de la Sierra Los Elegidos
 Beto Terrazas
 Zaino

Urban
Album of the Year
 Mas Flow 2'' – Luny Tunes & Baby Ranks
 Chosen Few El Documental – Chosen Few
 Desahogo – Vico C
 Flow la Discoteka – DJ Nelson
 Los K-Becillas'' – Master Joe & O.G. Black

Artist of the Year
 Daddy Yankee
 Don Omar
 Master Joe & O.G. Black
 Wisin & Yandel

Song of the Year
 "Lo Que Pasó, Pasó" – Daddy Yankee
 "Mayor que yo" – Baby Ranks, Daddy Yankee, Héctor "El Father", Tonny Tun Tun & Wisin & Yandel
 "Mírame" – Daddy Yankee
 "Rakata" – Wisin & Yandel
 "Reggaetón Latino" – Don Omar

Video of the Year
 "Nada Es Para Siempre" – Luis Fonsi
 "Víveme" – Laura Pausini
 "Que Seas Feliz" – Luis Miguel
 "No" – Shakira
 "Desahogo" – Vico C
 "Nace" – Anasol

Notes and references

External links
Premio lo Nuestro Official Web Site

2006 music awards
Lo Nuestro Awards by year
2006 in Florida
2006 in Latin music
2000s in Miami